The 1982 Cal Poly Pomona Broncos football team represented California State Polytechnic University, Pomona as a member of the Western Football Conference (WFC) during the 1982 NCAA Division II football season. Led by third-year head coach Roman Gabriel, Cal Poly Pomona compiled an overall record of 1–10 with a mark of 1–3 in conference play, placing fourth in the WFC. The team was outscored by its opponents 322 to 138 for the season. The Broncos played home games at Kellogg Field in Pomona, California.

1982 was the first season for the Western Football Conference. Three of the WFC's five teams has been members of California Collegiate Athletic Association (CCAA) the previous season: Cal State Northridge, Cal Poly Pomona, and Cal Poly. They were joined by Santa Clara and Portland State, both of which had been independents.

On December 1, 1982, Cal Poly Pomona announced that they were discontinuing their football program due to financial concerns. In its 36 years of play, from 1947 to 1982, the Cal Poly Pomona Broncos football program compiled an overall record of 143–190–9.

Schedule

Team players in the NFL
While no Cal Poly Pomona players were selected in the 1983 NFL Draft, several players transferred to other college as a result of the disbanding of the Cal Poly Pomona football program. The following competed at Cal Poly Pomona in 1982, transferred to another school, then were drafted by the NFL.

The following finished their Cal Poly Pomona career in 1982, were not drafted, but played in the NFL.

References

Cal Poly Pomona
Cal Poly Pomona Broncos football seasons
Cal Poly Pomona Broncos football